Saphan Chulalongkorn Railway Halt is a railway halt located in Na Mueang Subdistrict, Ratchaburi City, Ratchaburi. it is located  from Thon Buri Railway Station. It is adjacent to Chulalongkorn Bridge, of which the halt is named after.

Train services 
 Ordinary 251/252 Bang Sue Junction-Prachuap Khiri Khan-Bang Sue Junction
 Ordinary 254/255 Lang Suan-Thon Buri-Lang Suan
 Ordinary 261/262 Bangkok-Hua Hin-Bangkok
 Ordinary 351/352 Thon Buri-Ratchaburi-Thon Buri

References 

Railway stations in Thailand